Valley Line or Valley Lines may refer to:

 Valley Line (Edmonton), a future light rail line in Canada
 Valley Lines (train operating company), operating in Wales 1996–2001
 Valleys & Cardiff Local Routes, formerly Valley Lines, a rail network radiating from Cardiff, Wales

See also 
 
 
 Thalweg, the line of lowest elevation within a valley or watercourse